No Code is a Scottish video game developer based in Glasgow. The company was founded in August 2015 by Jon McKellan and Omar Khan. They are best known for creating Stories Untold (2017) and Observation (2019).

History 
No Code was founded in 2015 by Jon McKellan and Omar Khan. McKellan previously worked on Alien: Isolation along with Creative Assembly. One year after the creation of Alien: Isolation, McKellan left Creative Assembly and created No Code along with Khan.

No Code's first order of business was porting the iOS game, Lub vs Dub, to Android platforms. One year later, they created Super Arc Light for Android, and later Windows. Super Arc Light was nominated for two TIGA awards.

Another year later, and No Code released The House Abandon on itch.io for Ludum Dare 36, where it received positive reviews. According to McKellen, "Fast forward another 64 hours (after development started) and we submitted the final game with 15 seconds to spare before the cut off deadline." The same year, No Code received a deal with Devolver Digital, who then published Stories Untold - of which The House Abandon is the first chapter - which received very positive reviews. In 2019, Observation was released, which was also published by Devolver Digital.

In October 2022, it was announced that No Code would be developing a Silent Hill game called Silent Hill Townfall, with the help of Annapurna Interactive.

Games

References 

Video game companies of the United Kingdom
Video game development companies
British companies established in 2015
Video game companies established in 2015
Companies based in Glasgow
2015 establishments in Scotland